Pedro Fernández de Castro "the Castilian" (18 August, 1214, Morocco) was a Castilian nobleman, son of Fernando Rodríguez de Castro and Estefanía Alfonso la Desdichada (Stephanie "The Unfortunate"). He inherited the Infantazgo of León from his parents and was mayordomo mayor of Fernando II and his son Alfonso IX of León.

Family Origins
Born around 1160, Pedro Fernández de Castro was the son of Fernando Rodríguez de Castro "the Castilian", a member of the House of Castro, son of Rodrigo Fernández de Castro and his wife Elo Álvarez, daughter of Álvar Fáñez and Mayor Pérez. His mother, Stephanie "the Unfortunate", was an illegitimate daughter of King Alfonso VII of León and his mistress Urraca Fernández de Castro. As such, he was the nephew of Ferdinand II of León and Sancho III of Castile, and first cousin of Alfonso VIII of Castile and Alfonso IX of León.

Paternal inheritance and early years
In 1180, his mother, Stephanie Alfonso "The Unfortunate", was murdered by his father, Fernando Rodríguez de Castro, who believed his wife was being unfaithful with another man. After murdering his wife, he realized that he had been wrong and asked King Fernando II, his wife's half-brother, for forgiveness. 

After his father died in 1185, Fernández de Castro inherited parental property, including the lordship of Trujillo comprising numerous fortresses and towns in Extremadura and the Infantazgo of León which King Fernando II had given his parents in 1170. He also declared himself a vassal of his cousin King Alfonso VIII of Castile to whom he gave the lordship of Trujillo which the king then gave to the Order of Santiago in 1187, together with half of his income so that the order could populate the territories between the Tajo and the Guadiana. A year later, in 1187, he stipulated in his will that if he died without heirs, all his castles located in Extremadura and León would become the property of the Order of Santiago. In 1187, he donated Peña Falcón castle to the Order of Alcántara, in favor of his uncle, Fernando Díaz,  while the Order of Santiago was given the castles of La Solana and Santa Cruz  de los Cáñamos located in the present province of Ciudad Real.

He was entrusted by the king with the government of several fiefs, including  Lemos and Sarria in Galicia, plus others in Extremadura and Trasierra, as well as Asturias and the city of León. 

Between the years 1185 and 1188, Fernandez de Castro remained a loyal vassal to his cousin Alfonso VIII, but in 1189, he had a falling out with the king and left the kingdom of Castile. He went to serve his cousin Alfonso IX of León, father of Ferdinand III of Castile. Following in the footsteps of his father, he began to ally with the Almohads at different times in detriment of the interests of his cousin, the king of Castile. 

His attitude in the remaining years of the twelfth century depended on the evolution of relations between the kingdoms of Castile and León that were under the progressive influence of the papacy and  military orders. When King Alfonso IX of León married Teresa of Portugal, daughter of King Sancho I, with the ostensible purpose of an alliance against Castile, several fortresses controlled by Pedro Fernández de Castro were assigned to the Portuguese since he was known to be an enemy of his cousin Alfonso VIII. 

In 1191, the kingdoms of Navarre, Portugal, León and Aragon, formed the so-called League of Huesca, whose purpose was to combat the Kingdom of Castile. Meanwhile, Pope Celestine III threatened Alfonso IX of León with excommunication, after marrying his second cousin Berenguela of Castile. Between 1192 and 1193, Fernández de Castro was often in Castile. When he was near Seville, he suffered from a serious illness that doctors could not remedy and he asked to be taken to the Church of San Isidoro en Seville where the Christians of Seville would go often since the remains of Isidore had been buried there before being transferred to the Basilica of Saint Isidore in León. After fulfilling a promise he had made to the saint, he regained his health. Although the year that this took place is not known, it must have been around 1193, before the Battle of Alarcos.

In 1194, Fernandez de Castro tried to sabotage the signing of the Treaty of Tordehumos that was to put an end to the conflict between Alfonso IX of León and Alfonso VIII of Castile. He decided to leave the peninsular Christian kingdoms for Al-Andalus. He entered into an agreement with the Almohads and fought on their side at the Battle of Alarcos, in which Alfonso VIII's troops were defeated by the Muslims. 

After the battle, he acted as the mediator in the negotiations between King Alfonso VIII of Castile and King Alfonso IX of León in the city of Toledo. After the failed meeting between the two sovereigns, Fernandez de Castro stayed in León fighting against the kingdom of Castile while his cousin, the king of León, once again named him his mayordomo mayor.

During the war between Castile and León, and in order to help Castile, Pope Celestine III excommunicated King Alfonso IX, Pedro Fernández de Castro and the other nobles who had helped the Saracens in their fight against Castile. The Pope also released the Leonese King's vassals from their pledge of loyalty to their king.

Nevertheless, the hostilities between both kingdoms ceased in 1197 after the marriage of Alfonso IX of León and Berengaria of Castile since Berengaria's dowry included several castles that her husband had claimed from Castile.

Marriage and descent
He married Jimena Gómez de Manzanedo, daughter of Count Gómez González de Manzanedo and Milia Pérez de Lara, with whom he appears in several charters. They were the parents of:

 Álvaro Pérez de Castro "the Castilian" (died 1240). 
 Elo Pérez de Castro (died after 1243). Her first husband, whom she divorced, was Martim Sanches, an illegitimate son of King Sancho I of Portugal and Maria Aires de Fornelos. Divorced from her first husband, in 1205 she married Guerau IV de Cabrera  Viscount of Àger, son of Ponce de Cabrera and Marquesa (Miracle) de Urgel.  Elo and her husband were the parents of, among others,  Ponce I of Urgell. She was buried in the Monastery of Santa María de Valbuena.
 Stephanie Perez de Castro to whom her sister, countess Elo, in 1221 assigned 5,000 maravedíes of income in the Kingdom of Aragón.

Final years
In 1204, Fernandez de Castro again served as Alfonso IX of León's mayordomo mayor and, in the same year, with his wife Jimena and their children Álvaro and Elo  and became a familiares of the Order of Calatrava.

A year later, he donated to the Order of Salvatierra and its master, Martín Martínez, the hospital of Santa Olalla, the villa of Ranconada, half of the vineyards that he owned in Aldovea, Cortes, Santa Olaya and the surrounding areas to the south under the condition that the income from these properties were for supporting the hospital in Santa Olalla.  In 1204 his cousin Alfonso VIII of Castile restored all the properties that had been previously confiscated by the Leonese Crown.

In 1213, Fernández de Castro donated to the Monastery of Santa María de Sobrado, all his properties in Mayorga and surrounding areas. The charter was confirmed by his brother Martín Fernández a year later.

Pedro Fernandez de Castro died on August 18, 1214, while he was exiled in the kingdom of Morocco. His body was taken to the Iberian Peninsula, and subsequently taken to the kingdom of Castile, where his remains were buried in the Monastery of Santa María de Valbuena.  At the same monastery were subsequently buried two of his children, Álvaro and Elo Pérez de Castro.

Notes

References

Bibliography

 
 
 
 
 
 
 
 
 
 
 
 
 
 
 
 
 
 
 
 

1160s births
1214 deaths
12th-century nobility from León and Castile
Spanish untitled nobility
13th-century people from the Kingdom of León
House of Castro